Weetwood Moor near Wooler, Northumberland is a moor in the North of England which contains a scheduled monument. It has 26 known panels of Cup and ring mark petroglyphs carved into the sandstone.

The rock art is prehistoric and could be either Neolithic or early Bronze Age as it has been dated to between 1500 and 3800 BCE, though not everything on the site is old, the cairn near the rock art is modern.

See also

References

Petroglyphs
Archaeology of England
Archaeological sites in Northumberland
Wooler